The 2012 Tour du Haut Var was the 44th edition of the Tour du Haut Var cycle race and was held on 18–19 February 2012. The race started in Draguignan and finished in Fayence. The race was won by Jonathan Tiernan-Locke.

General classification

References

2012
2012 in road cycling
2012 in French sport